Saskia Lang (born 19 December 1986) is a German handball player for Thüringer HC and the German national team.

References

1986 births
Living people
German female handball players
People from Lörrach
Sportspeople from Freiburg (region)
German expatriate sportspeople in Switzerland
Expatriate handball players